Thomas-Simon Gueullette (2 June 1683 – 2 December 1766) was a French lawyer, playwright, scholar and man of letters, who also wrote fairy tales and works on the theatre itself.

Life
A lawyer at the Châtelet de Paris, then substitute for the procureur du roi, Gueullette was a bibliophile and collector who collected several placards and journals of his time,  His several works on the Théâtre-Italien, which survive in manuscript, formed the basis for the Parfaict brothers in their Histoire de l'ancien Théâtre Italien.

Gueullette was above all known for the publication of several amusing fairy tales : les Soirées bretonnes, nouveaux contes de fées (Paris, 1712, in-12) ; les Mille et un Quarts-d’heure, contes tartares (Ibid., 1715, 2 vol. in-12 ; 1753, 3 vol. in-12) ; les Aventures merveilleuses du mandarin Fum-Hoam, contes chinois (Ibid., 1723, 2 vol. in-12) ; les Sultanes de Guzarate, contes mogols (Ibid., 1732, 3 vol. in-12) ; les Mille et une Heures, contes péruviens (Amsterdam, 1733, 2 vol. in-12).

Gueullette was the author of over 60 plays, many of which he put on at the Théâtre-Italien, where some had great success : La vie est un songe in 1717 (for which he was the translator), Arlequin-Pluton (1719) ; le Trésor supposé, en trois actes (s. d.) ; l’Horoscope accompli (1727), etc.

He also worked as an editor : Histoire du petit Jehan de Saintré (1724, 3 vol. in-12) ; Essays by Montaigne (1725, 3 vol. in-4°) ; Works of Rabelais (1732, 6 vol. in-8°) ; Pathelin, by Pierre Blanchet (1748, in-12), etc.

The Bibliothèque de l'Arsenal has nine volumes of manuscripts by Gueullette.

Bibliography 
 Notes et souvenirs sur le Théâtre-Italien au XVIIIe siècle, publiés par J.-E. Gueullette, Paris, E. Droz, 1938.
 Pascal Bastien, L'Exécution publique à Paris au XVIIIe siècle, Seyssel, imprimerie Champ Vallon, 2006.

References 
 J. E. Gueullette, Thomas-Simon Gueullette : un magistrat du XVIIIe siècle, ami des lettres, du théâtre et des plaisirs Genève, Slatkine Reprints, 1977, 1938.

Works online 
 Le Chapeau de Fortunatus (1712)
 Arlequin Pluton (1719)
 Nocrion, conte allobroge (1747)
 La Confiance des cocus (1756)

Sources 
 Gustave Vapereau, Dictionnaire universel des littératures, Paris, Hachette, 1876, p. 950

External links 
Thomas-Simon Gueullette on Data.bnf.fr
His plays and their productions on CESAR
The Thousand and One Quarters of an Hour (Tartarian Tales) at Internet Archive
The Transmigrations of the Mandarin Fum-Hoam (Chinese Tales) at Internet Archive
Mogul Tales; or, the Dreams of Men Awake at HathiTrust
Peruvian Tales: Related in One Thousand and One Hours, by One of the Select Virgins of Cusco at Internet Archive

Writers from Paris
1683 births
1766 deaths
18th-century French dramatists and playwrights